The 2019 FIVB Beach Volleyball World Tour is the global elite professional beach volleyball circuit organized by the Fédération Internationale de Volleyball (FIVB) for the 2018 beach volleyball season. Starts in late August 2018 after the end of the year season, the 2019 FIVB Beach Volleyball World Tour Calendar comprised by three FIVB World Tour 5-star tournaments (including the World Tour Finals), twelve FIVB World Tour 4-star, five 3-star, eight 2-star and twenty-seven 1-star event, all organised by the FIVB. The World Championships will be held in Hamburg, Germany from June 28 to July 7, 2019.

The full calendar of events was announced on September 18, 2018.

Schedule
Key

Men

Women

Medal table by country

References

External links
2019 FIVB Beach Volleyball World Tour at FIVB.org
Swatch Major Series official website

 

World Tour
2019
FIVB